Haim Messika is a former Israeli footballer who played in Maccabi Netanya and Hapoel Kfar Saba.
He is the father of Reef Messika, also a footballer who plays for Hapoel Kfar Saba in Liga Leumit.

Honours
Israeli Premier League (1):
1982-83

References

1961 births
Israeli Jews
Living people
Israeli footballers
Maccabi Netanya F.C. players
Maccabi Ramat Amidar F.C. players
Hapoel Kfar Saba F.C. players
Hapoel Bat Yam F.C. players
Maccabi Sha'arayim F.C. players
Beitar Netanya F.C. players
Footballers from Netanya
Israeli people of Tunisian-Jewish descent
Liga Leumit players
Association football midfielders